Nikolas Marcel Cristiano Muci (born 8 February 2003) is a Swiss professional footballer who plays as a forward for Wil in the Swiss Challenge League on loan from Lugano.

Professional career
Muci made his professional debut with Lugano in a 2–1 Swiss Super League win over FC Luzern on 21 May 2021. On 1 June 2021, he signed a 4 year contract with Lugano until 2025.

On 23 June 2022, Muci moved on a two-year loan to Wil.

International career
Born in Switzerland, Muci holds Swiss, Italian and German passports. He is a youth international for Switzerland, having represented the Switzerland U16s, and U17s.

Personal life
Muci is of Italian descent through his father, and German descent through his mother. His brother, Alexander, is also a professional footballer in Switzerland.

Honours
Lugano
Swiss Cup: 2021–22

References

External links
 
 SFL Profile
 SFV U16 Profile
 SFV U17 Profile

2003 births
Living people
People from Lenzburg
Swiss men's footballers
Switzerland youth international footballers
Swiss people of Italian descent
Swiss people of German descent
Association football forwards
FC Lugano players
FC Wil players
Swiss Super League players
Swiss 1. Liga (football) players
2. Liga Interregional players
Sportspeople from Aargau